Candide Rochefort (February 8, 1904 – June 24, 1971) was a politician Quebec, Canada and a Member of the Legislative Assembly of Quebec (MLA).

Early life

He was born on February 8, 1904, in Salaberry-de-Valleyfield, Quebec and became a brick mason.

City politics

Rochefort ran for Mayor of Montreal in 1936 and 1938 and each time finished a distant third.

Member of the legislature

He ran as an Action libérale nationale candidate in the district of Montréal–Sainte-Marie in the 1935 provincial election and won against Liberal incumbent Gaspard Fauteux. Rochefort joined Maurice Duplessis's Union Nationale and was re-elected in the 1936 election. He was defeated by Mayor of Montreal Camillien Houde in the 1939 election.

Death

He died on June 24, 1971, in Montreal.

References

1904 births
1971 deaths
Action libérale nationale MNAs
Union Nationale (Quebec) MNAs
People from Salaberry-de-Valleyfield
Burials at Notre Dame des Neiges Cemetery